Pareuchontha olibra is a moth of the family Notodontidae. It is found along eastern slope of the Ecuadorian Andes.

The length of the forewings is about 14 mm for males. The ground color of the forewings is chocolate brown. There is a large immaculate white central area on the hindwings. The hindwing outer margin has a wide, dark brown band and the anterior margin is composed of a mixture of white and light brown scales. The anal margin is gray-brown

Etymology
The name is derived from the Greek word olibros (meaning slippery) and refers to the large, slippery boulders in the shallows of the Rıo Hollin, upon which the holotype was captured.

References

Moths described in 2008
Notodontidae of South America